Rodalies de Catalunya ("Commuter Rail of Catalonia") is the main commuter and regional rail system in the Spanish autonomous community of Catalonia. It is administered by the Government of Catalonia and operated by the national rail operator Renfe Operadora. The system consists of 17 service lines chiefly centred in the Barcelona area, serving a total of 203 stations throughout Catalonia, with an average number of 1,000 trains running on it every day. In 2016, it had an annual ridership of 117 million.

Most part of the system is the precursor of several commuter and regional lines running on the Iberian gauge mainline network in Catalonia, which were formerly under the administration of the Spanish government. On , as a result of the transfer of the administration of the Cercanías commuter rail system for Barcelona, known in Catalan as Rodalies Barcelona, the system was renamed "Rodalies de Catalunya". One year later, Renfe's regional rail services within Catalonia were included in the system after their administration had also been transferred. In 2014, two new commuter rail services in Camp de Tarragona and the Girona area were created as part of the system on 20 and 24 March, respectively.

Rodalies de Catalunya, especially its Barcelona commuter rail service, has been criticised for its high number of incidents, normally resulting in delays, though some minor accidents involving injuries have also occurred. The Catalan government has pointed out as their main cause poor investment in the system's infrastructure, which is owned by Adif, a public agency of the Spanish government in charge of conventional (non-high-speed) rail infrastructure in the country.

Current system

Barcelona commuter rail service

Rodalies de Catalunya's Barcelona commuter rail service consists of eight lines serving a large part of the Barcelona metropolitan area, even extending out of its limits in some cases. It is calculated that the service has a daily ridership of 350,000 travelers and, according to 2016 figures, an annual ridership of 108.3 million.

All lines (except line ) are centred in the city of Barcelona, where they run on two underground trunk routes. Contrarily, lines ,  and, partially,  use the Aragó Tunnel, comprising Passeig de Gràcia and El Clot-Aragó stations. Both trunk routes converge at Barcelona Sants railway station, the service's main station.

Renfe created the Cercanías Barcelona/Rodalia Barcelona branding in 1979 with the aim of absorbing the traffic of passengers who enter and leave the Catalan capital every day. The system became one of the crown jewels of Renfe, however, the reality was that the network was in very poor condition and required modernisation. In 1984 Renfe was in a critical economic situation due to the high number of deficient lines, which is why it decided to close many of them, part of which were saved by the Autonomous Communities. There was a modernisation of facilities, especially in stations, to adapt to new needs. In 1989–1991 Renfe created separate business units, due to the deep reorganisation of the rail service at the state level and divided the operation into commuter trains, medium distances and long distances. In 1992 there were many works and transformations, one of the most relevant, the removal of the track between Estació de França and Sant Adrià de Besòs along the Barcelona seafront, and the diversion of Line R1 through La Sagrera and the purchase of rolling stock specially designed for commuter services. It can be considered that in 1992 the network is consolidated in the way we know it today.

The current system is the precursor of former Renfe Operadora's Cercanías commuter rail system for Barcelona known as Rodalia Barcelona, and it has kept most of its features. Nevertheless, while all the other Cercanías systems around Spain use letter 'C' (from the Spanish word cercanías) plus a number for identifying their lines, Barcelona's commuter rail system uses letter 'R' instead (from its Catalan equivalent rodalia). As for the numbering, since Rodalies de Catalunya shares market with Ferrocarrils de la Generalitat de Catalunya (FGC) on the city's commuter rail, it can only use numbers from 1 to 10 leaving numbers 5 and 6 for FGC lines.

Since , a line named  has been running between Barcelona–El Prat Airport and Barcelona's Estació de França. The R10 was initially scheduled to resume services two years later.

On , a restructuring of the service affecting several lines was implemented. It mainly involved the creation of new line R8, the first line ever bypassing Barcelona, and the rerouting of line R7. Before the restructuring, former line R7 ran from L'Hospitalet de Llobregat to Martorell via the Meridiana Tunnel in Barcelona's city centre and Rubí. With the rerouting, it was shortened and started to run as a shuttle line between Cerdanyola Universitat and Barcelona Sant Andreu Arenal stations. New line R8 took over the former route of line R7 between Martorell and Cerdanyola Universitat, then continuing towards Granollers Centre. Thanks to the changes applied on lines R7 and R8, it was able to increase frequencies with a train every 6 minutes and 8 minutes during rush hour on lines R1 and R4, respectively.

Typically, most trains call at all the stations on the line. Nevertheless, some trains on lines R2 Sud, R3 and R4 operate limited service and only call at certain stations. Furthermore, most trains on all lines, excepting lines R2, R7 and R8, operate partial services, being line R1 exclusively operated with partial services.

Camp de Tarragona commuter rail service
On , Rodalies de Catalunya began running a commuter rail service in Camp de Tarragona, a region in southern Catalonia mainly centered in the polycentric metropolitan area formed by the cities of Tarragona and Reus. At the time it started services, it was the first commuter rail service in Catalonia not centered in Barcelona. The Camp de Tarragona commuter rail service consists of two lines, which are identified by letters 'RT' (the latter referring to Tarragona) plus a number, serving a total of 13 stations. Both lines converge at Tarragona railway station and are served by stopping trains only. Currently, it does not run on weekends.

Line  actually serves as a reinforcement for regional services between Tarragona and Reus with 9 additional trains in each direction, allowing a service pattern of approximately 30 minutes during rush hour and lower to one hour during off-peak time between the two cities, combining all lines.

On the other hand, line  provides a direct service between the Baix Penedès and the Costa Daurada areas. Before the creation of the line, the L'Arboç–L'Hospitalet de l'Infant route was not possible without interchanging at Sant Vicenç de Calders railway station.

Girona commuter rail service
It consists of a single 44-station line named RG1 (letter 'G' referring to Girona), which directly links the Alt Empordà, Gironès, Selva and Maresme areas. Before the RG1 started services, its route was only possible by interchanging at Maçanet-Massanes railway station. In addition, the RG1 has improved the service pattern at stations in the Girona area.

Line RG1 is actually an extension of some trains on Barcelona commuter rail service line  which formerly terminated at Maçanet-Massanes. Due to this fact, line RG1's L'Hospitalet de Llobregat–Mataró section, despite not serving as a Girona-centered commuter rail line, but as a Barcelona-centered one, is included as part of the Girona commuter rail service. At the beginning, the RG1 did not run on weekends and ran exclusively between L'Hospitalet de Llobregat and Figueres.

Lleida commuter rail service
It consists of five lines; two labelled RL1 and RL2 (letter 'L' referring to Lleida), which directly link Lleida with Balaguer and Àger areas, on the Lleida-La Pobla Line, operated by Ferrocarrils de la Generalitat de Catalunya (FGC), and parts of regional lines R12, R13 and R14 (see below), operated by Renfe Operadora, linking the city with Cervera and Vinaixa. The five lines in total have improved the service pattern at stations in the Lleida area.

For the Renfe Operadora-operated lines, see below.

Regional rail services
Rodalies de Catalunya's division for regional rail services consists of six lines centered in Barcelona that serve the whole of Catalonia and are sometimes extended towards the neighboring Spanish autonomous communities of Aragon and the Valencian Community as well as the French region of Languedoc-Roussillon. Although Estació de França serves as the main terminus station in Barcelona for most regional lines, especially those traveling towards southern and western Catalonia, all of them converge at Barcelona Sants only, which serves as the center of the service. The 2013 annual ridership for the regional rail services was 9.267 million.

In addition, none of the regional services (excepting line ) calls at all stations near Barcelona, which are already served by the city's commuter rail service. Yet, they usually stop at almost all the stations in Barcelona city centre.

The system's division for regional services is the precursor of several Renfe Operadora's Media Distancia regional lines in Catalonia, which were identified using letters 'Ca' (from the Catalan or the Spanish language form of Catalonia, Catalunya and Cataluña, respectively) plus a number. With the transfer of all regional services to the Catalan government, the lines happened to be identified with letter 'R' like the already transferred Barcelona commuter rail service lines. In order to differentiate the regional lines from those that are part of the Barcelona commuter rail service, the first ones use only numbers larger than 10—currently, numbers 11–16—, leaving numbers 1–10 for Barcelona commuter rail service lines.

Rodalies de Catalunya's regional lines have kept the same operating scheme just like before they were transferred, similarly to all other Renfe Operadora's Media Distancia lines around Spain. Likewise, there exist different types of train services. Specifically, the following types of train services are present in the system's division for regional lines:

 Regional (R): These services usually call at all the stations on the line.
 Regional Exprés (RE): In contrast to R services, RE services have fewer stops and are faster. They are, however, slightly more expensive than R services.
 Media Distancia/Mitjana Distància (MD): Similar to RE services referring to the number of stops and operating speed, though they are exclusively operated by Renfe series 449 trains, Renfe Operadora's newest rolling stock for regional lines, and are more expensive than RE trains. Currently, they run only on line .

Ticketing

In the Barcelona area, Rodalies de Catalunya participates in the Autoritat del Transport Metropolità's integrated fare system, allowing the use of standardized zone-based tickets with transfers to other operators such as the Barcelona Metro. In other regions, commuter rail tickets for other integrated fare systems are available from Autoritat Territorial de la Mobilitat del Camp de Tarragona, Autoritat Territorial de la Mobilitat de l'Àrea de Girona, and Autoritat Territorial de la Mobilitat de l'Àrea de Lleida.

Rodalies de Catalunya also offers its own zone-based fare system. These tickets do not permit transfers to other modes, such as bus or metro, and allow the purchase of single tickets (as opposed to the multi-ticket sales for ATM). Fares within the Barcelona area start at €2.20 for one zone to €6.30 for six zones.

2018 and 2019 derailments
On 20 November 2018, a train on the R4 line derailed due to a landslide between the Vacarisses and Vacarisses Torreblanca stations, causing one death and 49 injuries. Another derailment on the same line occurred on 8 February 2019 between Sant Vicenç de Castellet and Manresa, killing the driver and injuring several other people.

See also
 List of Rodalies de Catalunya stations
 Cercanías

Notes

References

External links
 
 
 Rodalies de Catalunya on Twitter
 Rodalia.info. Real-time information about commuter and regional rail lines in Catalonia provided by its users via Twitter
 Unofficial interactive map showing all Rodalies de Catalunya stations at Google Maps
 Information about Rodalies de Catalunya lines at trenscat.cat 

 
Rail transport in Catalonia
Transport in Occitania (administrative region)
Rail transport in the Valencian Community
Transport in Aragon
Regional rail in Spain
Renfe